Garbakoïra is a commune and village of the Cercle of Diré in the Tombouctou Region of Mali. The village lies on the left bank of the left arm of the River Niger, 35 km south west of the town of Timbuktu and 37 km north east of the town of Diré.

References

External links
.

Communes of Tombouctou Region